Martín Alonso del Valle Salinas (born 27 February 1988) is a Peruvian badminton player. He competed at the 2011 and 2015 Pan Am Games. In 2008, he won the bronze medal at the Pan Am Badminton Championships in the men's doubles event partnered with Antonio de Vinatea, and in 2009, he and Vinatea won the silver medal. In 2013, he won the gold medal in the mixed team event and a silver medal in the men's doubles event at the Bolivarian Games.

Achievements

Pan Am Championships 
Men's doubles

BWF International Challenge/Series 
Men's doubles

Mixed doubles

  BWF International Challenge tournament
  BWF International Series tournament
  BWF Future Series tournament

References

External links 
 

1988 births
Living people
Peruvian male badminton players
Badminton players at the 2015 Pan American Games
Badminton players at the 2011 Pan American Games
Pan American Games competitors for Peru
21st-century Peruvian people